Atri: My Dear Moments (stylized as ATRI -My Dear Moments-) is a 2020 visual novel game developed by Frontwing and Makura (枕) who are especially known for creating The Fruit of Grisaia visual novel, written by Asuta Konno who also wrote the If My Heart Had Wings visual novel and published by Aniplex.exe, a brand of Japanese anime and music production company Aniplex. The visual novel was digitally released on Steam for Windows on June 19, 2020 worldwide. Later, on December 16, 2021, the game was also released for Android, iOS and Nintendo Switch devices by iMel only in Japan.

A manga adaptation by Jako began serialization in Kadokawa Shoten's Comptiq magazine in October 2022, and an anime television series adaptation by Troyca has been announced.

Plot
In the near future, a sudden rise in sea levels floods the majority of the world and ends human civilization as we know it, forcing humanity to eke a living on what little dry land remains. Natsuki Ikaruga is a young man living under difficult circumstances in this new world. He has lost one of his legs in an accident which can only be replaced with a crude prosthetic, and he suffers constant bouts of phantom pain. One day, though, Natsuki rummages through his recently deceased grandmother's belongings to pay off a debt, only to awaken a young android girl name Atri, who will go on to change his life forever.

Characters

Main characters

Supporting characters

Music
The original soundtrack of the game was digitally released on October 28, 2020. At the same day, the original soundtrack CD was also released which included the original game disc. The soundtrack album contains 20 tracks composed by Fuminori Matsumoto, and also includes the full version of opening theme song "Light Across the Seas" by Mami Yanagi and ending theme song "Dear Moments" by Hikaru Akao.

Other media

Manga
A manga adaptation illustrated by Jako began serialization in Kadokawa Shoten's Comptiq magazine on October 7, 2022.

Anime
On September 24, 2022, during the Aniplex Online Fest 2022 event, an anime television series adaptation was announced. It is produced by Troyca and directed by Makoto Katō, with scripts written by Jukki Hanada.

References

External links
 Official visual novel website 
 Official manga website 
 Official anime website 
 
 

2020 video games
Android (operating system) games
Anime television series based on video games
Aniplex
Frontwing games
IOS games
Kadokawa Shoten manga
Nintendo Switch games
Seinen manga
Single-player video games
Troyca
Upcoming anime television series
Video games developed in Japan
Video games about artificial intelligence
Video games featuring female protagonists
Visual novels
Windows games